Kenia Stephanie Enríquez Rosas (born 21 October 1993) is a Mexican professional boxer. She has held the WBC interim female light flyweight title since 2017 and previously, the WBO female flyweight title from 2014 to 2015. As of September 2020, she is ranked as the world's second best active female light flyweight by The Ring and third by BoxRec.

Professional career
Enríquez made her professional debut on 6 July 2012, scoring a first-round technical knockout (TKO) victory against Guadalupe Valdez at the Salon Las Pulgas in Tijuana, Mexico.

After compiling a record of 10–0 (5 KOs), she faced Jolene Blackshear for the vacant WBC-NABF female light flyweight title on 4 April 2014 at the Four Points Sheraton Hotel in San Diego, California. After landing three left hooks to Blackshear's head, Enríquez unleashed a flurry of punches on her staggering opponent, prompting referee Jose Cobian to step in and call off the fight, awarding Enríquez her first professional title via seventh-round TKO.

Following a unanimous decision (UD) win against Mayela Perez in September, Enríquez faced former world title challenger Ana Arrazola for the vacant WBO female flyweight title on 21 November 2014 at the Crowne Plaza Hotel in San Diego, California. Enríquez defeated Arrazola by a shutout UD to become Mexico's first ever WBO female champion, with two judges scoring the bout 100–90 and the third scoring it 100–89. In her first title defence, she faced former world champion Melissa McMorrow on 28 February 2015 at the Centro de Convenciones in Rosarito Beach, Mexico. Enríquez suffered the first defeat of her career, losing her title via split decision (SD). Two judges scored the bout in favour of McMorrow at 98–92 and 97–93 while the third scored it for Enríquez at 96–94.

Following defeat to McMorrow, she scored five wins, two by stoppage, before facing Maria Salinas for the vacant WBC interim light flyweight title on 27 May 2017 at the Auditorio De La Expo in Ciudad Obregón, Mexico. Enríquez captured a world title, albeit an interim one, in her second weight class via third-round TKO.

Professional boxing record

References

Living people
1993 births
Mexican women boxers
Sportspeople from Tijuana
Boxers from Baja California
Light-flyweight boxers
Flyweight boxers
World Boxing Organization champions